Automated Imaging Association (AIA) is the world's largest machine vision trade group. AIA has more than 350 members from 32 countries, including system integrators, camera, lighting and other vision components manufacturers, vision software providers, OEMs and distributors. The association's headquarters is located in Ann Arbor, Michigan. Now part of the A3; Association for Advancing Automation AIA joins RIA; Robotic Industries Association, MCMA, Motion Control & Motor Association and A3 Mexico to form one of the largest collaborative trade association.  All organizations offer industry training, news and member benefits.

Standards
The Camera Link, Camera Link HS, GigE vision, USB3Vision and CoaXPress communication protocols are maintained and administered by the Automated Imaging Association (AIA).

Camera Link, Camera Link HS, GigE vision, USB3Vision, CoaXPress are all available for public download on their Vision Online website. Manufacturers of vision products using the standard must license the standard.

Notable members
Sony is among the multi-billion dollar member companies in the AIA. Cognex Corporation and National Instruments are also two big names in the machine vision industry that are members of the AIA. In 2010, 51% of the members are from North America, 30% are from Europe, 15% are from Eastern Asia, less than 1% are from South America, 2% are from Western Asia, less than 1% are from Southern Asia, 1% are from Southeastern Asia and less than 1% of the members are from Australia.

References

Technology trade associations
Organizations based in Ann Arbor, Michigan
Computer vision
Organizations established in 1984
1984 establishments in the United States